Petro Kondratyuk (born 21 April 1979) is a Ukrainian former professional footballer who played as a midfielder.

Honours
Desna Chernihiv
Ukrainian Second League: 2012–13

Individual
 Desna Chernihiv Player of the Year: 2013
 Top Scorer of Vorskla-2 Poltava

References

1979 births
Living people
Ukrainian footballers
FC Dnipro Cherkasy players
FC Desna Chernihiv players
FC Nyva Vinnytsia players
FC Mariupol players
FC Stal Alchevsk players
FC Vorskla Poltava players
FC Lviv players
FC Arsenal Kyiv players
FC Borysfen Boryspil players
FC Illichivets-2 Mariupol players
FC Vorskla-2 Poltava players
FC Ros Bila Tserkva players
Association football midfielders
Sportspeople from Kyiv Oblast